Bannu Airport  is a domestic airport located 6 nm (11 km) west of the city center of Bannu, in Khyber-Pakhtunkhwa province of Pakistan.

It was constructed to provide services to Bannu's population and neighbouring communities. It is not as large as other airports of Pakistan.

See also 
 List of airports in Pakistan

References

External links
 

Airports in Khyber Pakhtunkhwa
Bannu District